Yoshinobu Takahashi (高橋 由伸, born April 3, 1975) is a former Japanese  professional baseball player and manager. He spent his entire playing career with the Yomiuri Giants and served as the team's manager for three seasons. He graduated from Keio University.

A superb contact hitter, he is also known for his exemplary defensive play. He won the Golden Glove award in six consecutive years between 1998 and 2003. Despite his brilliant records, Takahashi has injured himself numerous times over the years going after fly balls. The injuries primarily resulted from his play style, in which he does not give up on fly balls until they hit the ground. His first injury was on September 14, 1999, at a Chunichi Dragons game, where he jumped diagonally against the outfield fence, causing a fractured shoulder bone.

He was selected to be part of the Japanese Olympic baseball team for the 2004 Summer Olympics, and contributed to the team's bronze medal.

Takahashi served as the Giants' manager from 2016 to 2018. He will remain with the Giants as a special adviser.

References

External links

Yoshinobu Takahashi at Sports-Reference.com

1975 births
Living people
People from Chiba (city)
Keio University alumni
Nippon Professional Baseball outfielders
Yomiuri Giants players
Baseball players at the 2004 Summer Olympics
Olympic baseball players of Japan
Olympic bronze medalists for Japan
Olympic medalists in baseball
Medalists at the 2004 Summer Olympics
Managers of baseball teams in Japan
Yomiuri Giants managers
Baseball people from Chiba Prefecture